The Lion, the Witch and the Wardrobe is a British children's television drama first broadcast by the BBC in 1988. It was the first series of The Chronicles of Narnia that ran from 1988 to 1990.

Plot
Narnia is the home of the great lion Aslan. During his long absence, his arch-enemy, the evil White Witch places Narnia in an eternal winter. However, with the return of Aslan and the arrival of the four Pevensie children, the Narnians are given a hope to end the tyranny of the Witch.

Cast
Richard Dempsey as Peter Pevensie
Sophie Cook as Susan Pevensie
Jonathan R. Scott as Edmund Pevensie
Sophie Wilcox as Lucy Pevensie
Maureen Morris as Mrs. Macready
Michael Aldridge as The Professor
Jeffrey Perry as Mr. Tumnus
Ailsa Berk and William Todd-Jones (puppet performance) and Ronald Pickup (voice) as Aslan
Big Mick as Little Man
Barbara Kellerman as The White Witch
Martin Stone as Maugrim
Kerry Shale as Mr. Beaver
Lesley Nicol as Mrs. Beaver
Bert Parnaby as Father Christmas
Hamish Kerr as Fox
Jill Goldston as Young Squirrel
Keith Hodiak and Garfield Brown as Aslan's Satyrs
Irene Marot and Kairen Kemp as Hags
Ken Kitson as Giant Rumblebuffin
Christopher Bramwell as Peter as an adult
Suzanne Debney as Susan as an adult
Charles Ponting as Edmund as an adult
Juliet Waley as Lucy as an adult

Episodes

References

External links

TV 1988 
BBC children's television shows
Television shows based on children's books
Christmas television series
Fiction set in 1940
1988 British television series debuts
1988 British television series endings